Fernando Martín-Valenzuela Marzo (born 1948) is a Spanish diplomat. He served as Secretary of State for Foreign Affairs from 2018 to 2020.

Biography 
Born in Montalbán (province of Teruel) on 12 November 1948, he earned a licentiate degree in Law from the University of Zaragoza and a diploma in International Studies from the Diplomatic School, joining the diplomatic corps in 1974.
Martín-Valenzuela, who was appointed as Chairman and CEO of the Spanish Agency for International Development Cooperation (AECID) in 1989, left the later post in 1991, becoming the Spanish permanent representative to the United Nations and other organizations in Geneva. 
He served as Ambassador to Canada from 1996 to 1999.

Following the investiture of Pedro Sánchez as Prime Minister in June 2018, Valenzuela was appointed as Secretary of State for Foreign Affairs of the Ministry of Foreign Affairs, European Union and Cooperation (second to Minister Josep Borrell in the informal hierarchy). He assumed office on 27 June 2018. Valenzuela left the office on 5 February 2020, being replaced by Cristina Gallach.

References 

1948 births
Living people
Ambassadors of Spain to Canada
Secretaries of State for Foreign Affairs (Spain)
Spanish diplomats
University of Zaragoza alumni